Wisconsin Heights High School is a high school in Dane County, Wisconsin. It is located between Mazomanie and Black Earth, along U.S. Route 14 and is surrounded by the Wisconsin countryside.

History
The school building houses both Wisconsin Heights High School and Wisconsin Heights Middle School, in separate wings, with the cafeteria and some classrooms shared. The school's slogan is "Every Child ... Every Class ... Every Day ... "

Athletics
WHHS won a state championship in boys cross country in 1973.

Notable alumni
Holly Brook, known as "Skylar Grey",  American multi-instrumentalist, singer and songwriter
Mike Wilkinson – professional basketball player

Notable faculty
 Lorenzo D. Harvey, American educator who served as Superintendent of Public Instruction of Wisconsin

References

External links 
Wisconsin Heights School District
GreatSchools, Inc.

Public high schools in Wisconsin
Schools in Dane County, Wisconsin